East Berlin was the name given to the eastern part of Berlin between 1949 and 1990, when it was the de facto capital of East Germany. It may also refer to:

 East Berlin, Connecticut
 East Berlin, Pennsylvania
 East Berlin, Nova Scotia
 East Berlin Formation, a Mesozoic, fossil-bearing geologic formation in Connecticut

See also
 West Berlin (disambiguation)
 Berlin (disambiguation)
 Berliner (disambiguation)
 New Berlin (disambiguation)
 Berlin Township (disambiguation)